Żebrak  is a village in the administrative district of Gmina Skórzec, within Siedlce County, Masovian Voivodeship, in east-central Poland.

The name of the village means "beggar" in Polish.

Polish general Jan Zygmunt Skrzynecki was born in Żebrak in 1787.

References

Villages in Siedlce County